WQID-LP (105.3 FM, "Hot 105.3") is a low-power FM radio station licensed to serve the community of Hattiesburg, Mississippi, and serving the Laurel-Hattiesburg area. The station airs a urban contemporary format.

External links
 

QID-LP
QID-LP
Urban contemporary radio stations in the United States